Yılmaz Urul (born 8 February 1942) is a Turkish footballer. He played in four matches for the Turkey national football team from 1964 to 1965.

References

1942 births
Living people
Turkish footballers
Turkey international footballers
Place of birth missing (living people)
Association footballers not categorized by position